Capsule: The Best of KOD 1988–94 is a compilation album by British alternative rock/dream pop group Kitchens of Distinction. The two disc set was released by One Little Indian Records on 21 April 2003. The first disc features some of the band's best songs, culled from their four albums: Love Is Hell (1989); Strange Free World (1991); The Death of Cool (1992); and Cowboys and Aliens (1994), while the bonus disc collects B-sides, acoustic versions and live tracks. The booklet features track-by-track notes by lead singer/bassist Patrick Fitzgerald.

Track listing

Notes
Disc one:
 Tracks 1, 3, and 6 taken from Love Is Hell (April 1989)
 Tracks 2, 5, 13, and 15 taken from Strange Free World (February 1991)
 Tracks 8, 10, 12, and 14 taken from The Death of Cool (August 1992)
 14 runs over a minute longer than the album version
 Tracks 4, 7, 9, 11, and 16 taken from Cowboys and Aliens (October 1994)
 4 and 11 remixed by Pascal Gabriel
 Tracks 2, 5, 8, 10, 12, 13, 14, and 15 mixed with Helen Woodward
 Tracks 4, 7, and 11 feature backing vocals by Kate Meehan

Disc two:
 Tracks 1 and 2 taken from the single "The 3rd Time We Opened the Capsule" (May 1989)
 Track 3 taken from the single "Prize" (October 1988)
 Track 4 taken from the "Elephantine" EP (October 1989)
 Tracks 5 and 6 taken from the single "Quick as Rainbows" (March 1990), recorded live at Berlin Metropole for German radio
 Tracks 7, 8, and 9 taken from the "Drive That Fast" EP (January 1991); mixed by Hugh Jones with Helen Woodward
 Tracks 10, 11, and 12 taken from the "Breathing Fear" single (May 1992)
 Track 13 taken from the "When in Heaven" single (August 1992); mixed by Hugh Jones with Helen Woodward
 Track 15 taken from the "Now It's Time to Say Goodbye" single (September 1994)
 Tracks 14, 16, 17, 18, and 19 are previously unreleased

Credits
 Front cover photo by Harry Borden.
 Group shot (in center pages) by Colin Bell.
 Live in Tooting photo by anonymous.
 Live in Camden photo by Marcus Rose.
 Design by Patrick Fitzgerald and Small Japanese Soldier.

Kitchens of Distinction albums
2003 greatest hits albums
Albums produced by Hugh Jones (producer)
One Little Independent Records compilation albums